George C. Lindsay (1855 – 1945) was an American composer and guitarist.  He taught the celebrated guitarist Vahdah Olcott-Bickford after hearing her play when she was nine years old, and became her lifelong friend.

References

1855 births
1945 deaths
American male guitarists
American male composers